Shadowcon may refer to:

ShadowCon (Memphis, Tennessee)
ShadowCon (Oslo), in Norway